Flowers in Formaldehyde is the second EP by darkwave band Sopor Aeternus & the Ensemble of Shadows, and was released in 2004 as a companion to the album La Chambre D'Echo - Where the Dead Birds sing. Only 2,000 CDs and 700 LPs were pressed.

Originally announced as The Adventures of Ms Penny Dreadful, Flowers featured four new songs, two instrumentals of songs from La Chambre D'Echo and an extensive remix of "Do you know my Name ?" from Sopor Aeternus' first album, Ich töte mich.... The first half of the EP remains some of Sopor Aeternus' most pop-oriented work yet.

Flowers in Formaldehyde was re-issued the following year as part of the rarities box set Like a Corpse Standing in Desperation. Apocalyptic Vision explained that extensive counterfeiting of the EP was cause for its inclusion in the set.

Track listing

Personnel
 Susannah Simmons: Violin
 Elizabeth Tollington: Cello
 Miriam Hughes: Flute
 Tonia Price: Clarinet
 Andrew Pettitt: Oboe
 Doreena Gor: Bassoon
 Tim Barber: Trumpet
 Julian Turner: Trombone
 Anthony Bartley: Tuba
 Paul Brook: Drums
 Anna-Varney Cantodea: Vocals, all other instruments and programming

2004 EPs
Sopor Aeternus and The Ensemble of Shadows albums